Rouen-Rive-Droite is a large railway station serving the city of Rouen, Normandy, France. The station is on Rue Verte in the north of the city. Services are mainly intercity but many services are local. There are also TGV from Le Havre to Marseille-Saint-Charles.

History 
The station opened its doors in 1847 when the Rouen–Le Havre section of the Paris–Le Havre railway opened to service. The line previously had its terminus at Rouen Rive-Gauche. With the increase in traffic, the construction of the new station on the North bank of the River Seine started.  The station building was designed in Art Nouveau style by architect Adolphe Dervaux, with commissioned sculpture by Camille Lefèvre.  The station was inaugurated on 4 July 1928 by French President Gaston Doumergue. At first named Rue Verte, the station then changed name to Rive-Droite. In 1994 an interchange was built to serve Rouen métro.

Services 
With the high-speed rail network TGV, Rouen is connected to the following stations:
 Le Havre–Rouen-Rive-Droite–Mantes-la-Jolie–Versailles-Chantiers–Massy–Lyon-Part-Dieu–Valence TGV–Avignon TGV–Marseille-Saint-Charles

The station is served by regional trains to Paris, Le Havre, Dieppe, Caen and Amiens.

References

External links
 

Railway stations in France opened in 1847
Railway stations in France opened in 1928
Buildings and structures in Rouen
Rouen Rive-Droite
Transport in Rouen
Art Nouveau architecture in France
Art Nouveau railway stations